Helena is the Latin form of Helen. People with this name include:

Ancients

Mononyms
Helena, mother of Constantine I (died 330), Roman mother of Emperor Constantine
Helena (wife of Julian) (died 360), Roman daughter of Emperor Constantine
Helena (niece of Justin II), niece of Empress Sophia of the Byzantine Empire
Helena (daughter of Robert Guiscard) (fl. 1076–1081), fiancée of Constantine Doukas
Helena (daughter of Alypius), wife of Constantine VIII
Helena of Adiabene (died c. 56), Assyrian queen
Helena of Egypt, 4th century BC painter
Saint Helena of Serbia (died 1314), Serbian queen

Full names
Helena Lekapene, daughter of Romanos I Lekapenos and wife of Constantine VII
Helena Kantakouzene, daughter of John VI Kantakouzenos and wife of  John V Palaiologos
Helena Dragaš, daughter of Konstantin Dejanović and wife of Manuel II Palaiologos

Modern
Helena Basilova (born 1983), classical pianist
Helena Blackman (born 1982), English actress and singer
Helena Blavatsky (1831–1891), Russian writer
Helena Bonham Carter (born 1966), English actress
Helena Braun (1903–1990), German soprano
Helena Chan (born 1989), Hong Kong-Swedish presenter and fashion model
Helena Christensen (born 1968), Danish model
Helena Cobban (born 1952), British-born American writer
Helena Coleman (1860—1953), Canadian poet, music teacher, and writer
Helena Deland Canadian songwriter, composer, singer and musician
Helena Espinosa Berea (ca.1895–ca.1960), Mexican academic
Helena Gloag (1909–1973), Scottish actress
Helena Guergis (born 1969), Canadian politician
Helena Janeczek (born 1964), author
Helena Josefsson (born 1978), Swedish singer
Helena Kadare (born 1943), Albanian author 
Helena Chmura Kraemer (fl. 1960s–2010s), American biostatistician
Helena Krzemieniewska (1878–1966), Polish botanist and microbiologist
Helena Laine (born 1955), Finnish athlete
Helena Lehtinen, Finnish jeweller and teacher
Helena Lisická (1930–2009), Czech ethnographer and writer of fairy tales and legends
Helena Margaretha Van Dielen (1774–1841) Dutch painter
Helena Matheopoulos, Greek journalist, author, and opera authority
Helena Mattsson (born 1984), Swedish actress
Helena Modjeska (1840–1909), Polish actress
Helena Molony (1884–1967), Irish labor activist
Helena Moreno (born 1977), American television reporter
Helena Moreno (actress) (born 1989), Angolan actress
Helena Noguerra (born 1969), Belgian actress and singer
Helena Norberg-Hodge, Swedish linguist and writer
Helena Nyblom (1843–1926), Swedish author
Helena Paparizou (born 1982), Greek-Swedish singer and songwriter
Helena Ranaldi (born 1966), Brazilian actress
Helena Rasiowa (1917–1994), Polish mathematician
Helena Resano (born 1974), Spanish journalist
Helena Rojo (born 1944), Mexican actress
Helena Rubinstein (1870–1965), Polish industrialist
Helena Sanders (1911–1997), Cornish humanitarian, cultural activist, politician and, poet  
Helena Suková (born 1965), Czech tennis player
Gelena Topilina (born 1994), Russian competitor in synchronized swimming
Gelena Velikanova (1922–1998), Soviet pop singer
Helena Vildová (born 1972), Czech tennis player
Helena Vondráčková (born 1947), Czech singer
Helena Wong (politician) (born 1959), former member of the Legislative Council of Hong Kong for Kowloon West constituency
Helena Wong (weightlifter) (born 1988), Singaporean weightlifter
Princess Helena of the United Kingdom (1846–1923), daughter of Queen Victoria
Princess Helena Victoria of Schleswig-Holstein (1870–1948)
Heloísa Helena (politician) (born 1962), Brazilian politician
Princess Helena of Nassau (1831–1888), Princess consort of Waldeck and Pyrmont
Princess Helena of Waldeck and Pyrmont (1861–1922), Duchess of Albany
Princess Helena of Waldeck and Pyrmont (1899–1948), Hereditary Grand Duchess of Oldenburg
Lady Helena Gibbs (1899–1969), daughter of the 1st Marquess of Cambridge

Fictional characters
Helena, fictional character in the 1921 science fiction play R.U.R. (Rossum's Universal Robots) by Karel Čapek
Helena (Dead or Alive), fictional character in the Dead or Alive video game series
Helena (A Midsummer Night's Dream), fictional character in the play A Midsummer Night's Dream by William Shakespeare
Helena, fictional character in the 1993 film Boxing Helena
Helena Adams, a survivor in the video game Identity V
Helena Cassadine, fictional character in the television series General Hospital
Helena (Encantadia), fictional character in the television series Encantadia
Helena Harper, fictional character in the video game Resident Evil 6
Helena Kurcewicz, fictional character in the 1884 novel With Fire and Sword by Henryk Sienkiewicz
Helena Peabody, fictional character in the television series The L Word
Helena Ravenclaw, also known as the Grey Lady, fictional character in the Harry Potter series
Helena Russell, fictional character in the television series Space: 1999
Helena Wu, fictional character in the mystery teen drama The Society
Helena, girlfriend to Hercules in The Mighty Hercules animated series from the 1960s
Helena Manning, fictional character in the television series Orphan Black
Helena, a vampire in the Hellsing animated TV-series from 2001
Huntress (Helena Wayne), DC comics superhero (debuted 1977)
Huntress (Helena Bertinelli), DC comics superhero (debuted 1989)

Given names of Greek language origin
Danish feminine given names
Norwegian feminine given names
Icelandic feminine given names
Swedish feminine given names
Finnish feminine given names
German feminine given names
Greek feminine given names
English feminine given names
Scottish feminine given names
Scandinavian feminine given names
Welsh feminine given names
Irish feminine given names
Polish feminine given names
Spanish feminine given names
Czech feminine given names
Slovak feminine given names
Portuguese feminine given names